The Philadelphia Press (or The Press) is a defunct newspaper that was published from August 1, 1857, to October 1, 1920.

The paper was founded by John Weiss Forney. Charles Emory Smith was editor and owned a stake in the paper from 1880 until his death in 1908. In 1920, it was purchased by Cyrus H. K. Curtis, who merged the Press into the Public Ledger.

In 1882, a Philadelphia Press newspaper story sparked a sensational trial after a journalist caught body snatchers from the Jefferson Medical College stealing corpses from Lebanon Cemetery for use as cadavers by medical students.

Before being published in book form, Stephen Crane's 1895 novel The Red Badge of Courage was serialized in The Philadelphia Press in 1894. Earlier, in 1888, Robert Louis Stevenson's The Black Arrow appeared in the paper in serialized form under the title "The Outlaws of Tunstall Forest," with illustrations by Alfred Brennan, before the first hardcover book publication by Charles Scribner's Sons.

Notable contributors
Emily Pomona Edson Briggs, columnist, notable early female journalist
Thomas Morris Chester, African-American Civil War correspondent
Benjamin De Casseres, proofreader, theatrical critic and editorial writer
Joel Cook, American Civil War correspondent with the Army of the Potomac
Elisha Jay Edwards, investigative journalist
John Russell Young, chief Civil War correspondent

The 'Philadelphia Four'
In addition to written contributions, illustrations were also produced for the newspaper. Four illustrators, each a member of the 'Charcoal Club' founded by Robert Henri, became known as the 'Philadelphia Four':
William Glackens
George Luks
Everett Shinn
John French Sloan

See also
List of defunct newspapers of the United States

References

Defunct newspapers of Philadelphia
Publications established in 1857
Publications disestablished in 1920
1857 establishments in Pennsylvania